Gros-de-Vaud District is a district in Vaud canton.

Of this area,  or 66.7% is used for agricultural purposes, while  or 23.7% is forested.

Demographics

In  there were 312 live births to Swiss citizens and 54 births to non-Swiss citizens, and in same time span there were 217 deaths of Swiss citizens and 17 non-Swiss citizen deaths.  Ignoring immigration and emigration, the population of Swiss citizens increased by 95 while the foreign population increased by 37.  There were 17 Swiss men who emigrated from Switzerland and 6 Swiss women who immigrated back to Switzerland.  At the same time, there were 156 non-Swiss men and 130 non-Swiss women who immigrated from another country to Switzerland.  The total Swiss population change in 2008 (from all sources, including moves across municipal borders) was an increase of 527 and the non-Swiss population increased by 406 people.  This represents a population growth rate of 2.7%.

The age distribution, in Gros-de-Vaud is; 4,635 children or 12.5% of the population are between 0 and 9 years old and 4,907 teenagers or 13.2% are between 10 and 19.  Of the adult population, 4,193 people or 11.3% of the population are between 20 and 29 years old.  5,531 people or 14.9% are between 30 and 39, 6,224 people or 16.8% are between 40 and 49, and 4,699 people or 12.7% are between 50 and 59.  The senior population distribution is 3,758 people or 10.1% of the population are between 60 and 69 years old, 1,991 people or 5.4% are between 70 and 79, there are 978 people or 2.6% who are 80 and 89, and there are 168 people or 0.5% who are 90 and older.

Mergers and name changes
 On 1 January 2009, the former municipalities of Malapalud merged into the municipality of Assens.
 On 1 September 2006, the Cossonay district (District de Cossonay), Échallens district (District d'Échallens), Moudon district (District de Moudon), Yverdon district (District d'Yverdon) and Oron District (District d'Oron) were dissolved and merged to form the Gros-de-Vaud district.
 The municipalities of Bettens, Bournens, Boussens, Daillens, Lussery-Villars, Mex (VD), Penthalaz, Penthaz, Sullens and Vufflens-la-Ville came from the Cossonay district (District de Cossonay).
 The municipalities of Assens, Bercher, Bioley-Orjulaz, Bottens, Bretigny-sur-Morrens, Cugy (VD), Dommartin, Échallens, Éclagnens, Essertines-sur-Yverdon, Etagnières, Fey, Froideville, Goumoens-la-Ville, Goumoens-le-Jux, Malapalud, Morrens (VD), Naz, Oulens-sous-Échallens, Pailly, Penthéréaz, Poliez-le-Grand, Poliez-Pittet, Rueyres, Saint-Barthélemy (VD), Sugnens, Villars-le-Terroir, Villars-Tiercelin and Vuarrens came from the Échallens district (District d'Échallens).
 The municipalities of Boulens, Chapelle-sur-Moudon, Correvon, Denezy, Martherenges, Montaubion-Chardonney, Neyruz-sur-Moudon, Ogens, Peyres-Possens, Saint-Cierges, Sottens, Thierrens and Villars-Mendraz came from the Moudon district (District de Moudon).
 The municipality of Oppens came from the Yverdon district (District d'Yverdon).
 The municipality of Peney-le-Jorat came from the Oron District (District d'Oron).
 On 1 July 2011, the municipalities of Éclagnens, Goumoens-la-Ville and Goumoens-le-Jux merged into the new municipality of Goumoëns.  The municipalities of Dommartin, Naz, Poliez-le-Grand and Sugnens merged into the new municipality of Montilliez.  The municipalities of Villars-Tiercelin, Montaubion-Chardonney, Sottens, Villars-Mendraz and Peney-le-Jorat merged on 1 July 2011 into the new municipality of Jorat-Menthue.
 On 1 January 2013, the municipalities of Chapelle-sur-Moudon, Correvon, Denezy, Martherenges, Neyruz-sur-Moudon, Peyres-Possens, Saint-Cierges, Thierrens and Chanéaz (from Jura-Nord vaudois District) merged into the new municipality of Montanaire.
 On 1 July 2021 the municipality of Bioley-Orjulaz merged into Assens.

Politics
In the 2007 federal election the most popular party was the SVP which received 27.84% of the vote.  The next three most popular parties were the SP (18.3%), the FDP (14.87%) and the Green Party (13.33%).  In the federal election, a total of 10,796 votes were cast, and the voter turnout was 46.6%.

Communes
<div style="padding:1em 20px 1em 20px; color:#000000;text-align:left;">

See also
Gros-de-Vaud
Swiss plateau

References

Districts of the canton of Vaud